The Bybee Bridge is a bridge over McLoughlin Boulevard (Oregon Route 99E) in southeast Portland, Oregon connecting the Eastmoreland and Sellwood neighborhoods. The bridge is named after James Francis Bybee.

History

The original Bybee Bridge consisted of three different structures built between 1911 and 1943.

In the early 2000s, structural analysis determined the bridge did not provide adequate clearance for trucks driving below, concrete girders were damaged from collisions, and suitable bike lines and sidewalks were not available.

In 2004 the bridge was partially rebuilt by Capital Concrete Construction Inc., closing in February and re-opening in November ahead of schedule. 80 percent of the $3–4 million renovation project came from federal funds; 10 percent each was paid by the city of Portland and the Oregon Department of Transportation.

By April 2005 cracks had already started to appear in the concrete. According to the supervising bridge engineer, the cracks "did not pose any threat to the integrity of the bridge."

During construction of the Southeast Bybee Boulevard station on the MAX Orange Line, the bridge was widened and elevators and bus pullouts were installed. The station is an island platform located underneath the overpass, with a cupola on the bridge serving as an entrance.

Bioswale
According to The Conservation Registry the Bybee Bridge Bioswale, located at the northwest side of the bridge to treat stormwater, was also completed in November 2004. The bioswale contains mostly mowed grass which drains water from the bridge to Crystral Springs. A September 2011 survey of the project showed low invasive species activity but noted the presence of blackberry, morning glory and other weeds. Native plants such as alder, ash, cattail, cottonwood, Douglas-fir, rushes  and sedges were also present.

See also
 Bybee–Howell House, the Sauvie Island house built by James Francis Bybee
 Transportation in Portland, Oregon

References

External links

 Image: Bybee Bridge Bioswale, The Conservation Registry

1911 establishments in Oregon
Bridges in Portland, Oregon
Concrete bridges in the United States
Eastmoreland, Portland, Oregon
Road bridges in Oregon
Sellwood-Moreland, Portland, Oregon